Starobaltachevo (İśke Baltas) is a rural locality (a selo) and the administrative center of Baltachevsky District of the Republic of Bashkortostan, Russia. Population:

References

Notes

Sources

Rural localities in Baltachevsky District